Bokrijk is a railway station in the Bokrijk area close to the town of Genk, Limburg, Belgium. The station opened on 3 March 1874 and is located on line 21A. The station was closed on 2 October 1949 and reopened on 26 May 1979. The train services are operated by National Railway Company of Belgium (NMBS).

Train services
The station is served by the following services:

Intercity services (IC-03) Blankeberge/Knokke - Bruges - Ghent - Brussels - Leuven - Hasselt - Genk

See also
 List of railway stations in Belgium

References

External links
 
 Bokrijk railway station at Belgian Railways website

Railway stations in Belgium
Railway stations opened in 1874
Railway stations in Limburg (Belgium)
Genk